Jerrell is a given name. Notable people with the given name include:

Jerrell Freeman (born 1986), American football player
Jerrell Gavins (born 1988), Canadian football player
Jerrell Harris (born 1989), American football player
Jerrell Jackson (born 1990), American football player
Jerrell Powe (born 1987), American football player